Bloomfield is a surname. Notable people with the surname include:

 Allen J. Bloomfield (1883–1932), New York politician
 Angela Bloomfield (born 1972), New Zealand actor and director
 April Bloomfield (born 1974), English chef
 Ashley Bloomfield (born 1965/1966), New Zealand public health official
 Benjamin Bloomfield, 1st Baron Bloomfield (1768–1846), Private Secretary to the Sovereign
 Clara D. Bloomfield (1942–2020), American physician-researcher
 Clarence Bloomfield Moore (1852–1936), American archaeologist
 Debra Bloomfield (born 1952), American photographer
 Fannie Bloomfield Zeisler (1863–1927), Austrian-born U.S. pianist
 Harry Bloomfield (1883–1950), Australian rugby league footballer
 Janet Bloomfield (1953–2007), peace and disarmament campaigner
 Jimmy Bloomfield (1934–1983), English football player and manager
 Joseph Bloomfield (1753–1823), Governor of New Jersey
 Kenneth Bloomfield (born 1931), former head of the Northern Ireland Civil Service
 Leonard Bloomfield (1887–1949), American linguist
 Lou Bloomfield (born 1956), American physics professor
 Lynvale Bloomfield (1959–2019), Jamaican doctor and politician
 Matt Bloomfield (born 1984), English professional footballer
 Maurice Bloomfield (1855–1928), American philologist and Sanskrit scholar
 Meyer Bloomfield (1878–1938), Romanian-American lawyer and social worker
 Michael J. Bloomfield (born 1959), American astronaut
 Mike Bloomfield (1943–1981), American guitarist
 Posesi Bloomfield (born 1974), Marshallese politician
 Richard Bloomfield (born 1983), English professional male tennis player
 Robert Bloomfield (1766–1823), English poet
 Robert Lee Bloomfield (1827–1916), American businessman
 Rob Bloomfield (born 1977), British musician & music producer
 Samuel Thomas Bloomfield (1783–1869), scholar, textual critic
 Theodore Bloomfield (1923–1998), conductor
 Timothy Bloomfield (born 1973), English cricketer
 William Anderson Bloomfield (1873–1954), Scottish recipient of the Victoria Cross

See also
 Baron Bloomfield, a title in the Peerage of Ireland
Broomfield (surname)

Surnames
English-language surnames
Ashkenazi surnames
Surnames of English origin
Surnames of British Isles origin
Surnames from ornamental names